Giuseppe Orsoni (1691–1755) was an Italian painter and scenic designer of the Baroque period, active in Northern Italy.

He first studied under Domenico Maria Viani, then studied quadratura under Pompeo Aldrovandini. He was active as a scenic designer in Genoa, Lucca, Turin, and Brescia. He worked with Stefano Orlandi in Bologna, and with Carlo Antonio Buffagnotti. He was made a professor of the Accademia Clementina.

References

1691 births
1755 deaths
18th-century Italian painters
Italian male painters
Italian Baroque painters
Italian scenic designers
18th-century Italian male artists